Phillip County was one of the original Nineteen Counties in New South Wales and is now one of the 141 Cadastral divisions of New South Wales. It includes the area to the east of Mudgee and Gulgong. The Cudgegong River is the border to the south-west, and the Goulburn River the border to the north.

Phillip County was named in honour of Governor of New South Wales, Admiral Arthur Phillip. The Electoral district of Phillip, Brisbane and Bligh was the first electoral district for the area, between 1856 and 1859.

Parishes within this county
A full list of parishes found within this county; their current LGA and mapping coordinates to the approximate centre of each location is as follows:

References

Counties of New South Wales